The Nanum fonts is a series of open source unicode fonts designed for the Korean language, designed by Sandoll Communications (Korean: 산돌 커뮤니케이션) and Fontrix (Korean: 폰트릭스). It includes a sans serif (gothic), serif (myeongjo), monospace (coding), pen script, and brush script typefaces. It was published and distributed by Naver.

It is the basic Korean font of Ubuntu Linux since version 12.04. The five Nanum fonts are also included in Mac OS X 10.7 Lion.

Variations

Nanum Gothic 
It was designed by Sandoll Communications and released in 2008-2011. It has three weights without Italics

Nanum Gothic Coding 

It is similar with Nanum Gothic but is designed for developers to use easily. It was released in 2009. It is the monospaced edition of Nanum Gothic. It has two weights without Italics.

Nanum Myeongjo 

It was designed by Fontrix and released in 2008. It has three weights without Italics

Nanum handwriting (brush and pen) 

It consists of two types of handwriting, brush and pen. It was included with the Nanum Fonts 3.0 version.

Nanum Gothic Eco and Nanum Myeongjo Eco 
It was developed by technical tie-up with Ecofont BV. It was designed to save ink on printers.

See also
Myongjo
Noto Fonts (Korean is Noto Sans KR and Noto Serif KR)

References

External links 
Nanum font
Nanum Gothic coding font
Nanum Gothic on Google Fonts
Nanum Myeongjo on Google Fonts
Nanum Gothic Coding on Google Fonts
Nanum Pen Script on Google Fonts
Nanum Brush Script on Google Fonts

Typography